Official Secrets Act (OSA) was a pop-rock band from London, England. Thomas Burke, Alexander Mackenzie, and Lawrence Diamond formed a band at Leeds University after bonding over an interest in British military history. Michael Evans joined after catching one of their early gigs.

The band has drawn inspiration from both British and American guitar-based bands, such as Talking Heads, Futureheads and Blur.

OSA was the first band to perform in Black Cab Sessions's the Secret Garden Party Sessions in July 2009.

Former bassist Lawrence James Diamond is the son of singer/songwriter Jim Diamond

Discography

Albums
 Understanding Electricity (30 March 2009)

Singles
 So Tomorrow (8 December 2008)
 Girl from The BBC (16 March 2009)
 Bloodsport (15 June 2009)

References

External links
 Official Secrets Act on Myspace
 Record Label
 last.fm profile
 NME article
 AltSounds article
 MusicOMH track review for So Tomorrow

English pop rock music groups